Coleophora picardella is a moth of the family Coleophoridae. It is found in France. Larvae can be found from late August to spring.

References

picardella
Moths of Europe
Moths described in 1934